The following is the complete discography of American band Cake.

Albums

Studio albums

Compilation albums

Live albums

Demo albums

Extended plays

Singles

Other charting songs

Covers 
Cake has recorded a number of covers, which are songs written and recorded by other artists.
The song "Sad Songs & Waltzes", on the 1996 album Fashion Nugget, is a cover and was originally written and recorded by Willie Nelson in 1973 on his album Shotgun Willie.
The song "I Will Survive" is also found on Fashion Nugget, and is an alternative remake of Gloria Gaynor's "I Will Survive" published in 1978.
The song "Perhaps, Perhaps, Perhaps" is a cover of a song by Cuban songwriter Osvaldo Farrés called "Quizás, Quizás, Quizás," with English lyrics by Joe Davis. It is found on Fashion Nugget.
The song "The Guitar Man", from the album Pressure Chief, is a cover of a hit by Bread.
The song "War Pigs" is a cover of a Black Sabbath song from their album Paranoid, and is on their album B-Sides and Rarities.
The song "Never, Never Gonna Give You Up" is a cover of a Barry White song on the soundtrack to An American Werewolf in Paris.
 The song "Ruby, Don't Take Your Love to Town" is a Mel Tillis composition, popularised in 1969 by Kenny Rogers & covered by Cake on the album B-Sides and Rarities.
The song "Strangers in the Night" is a Frank Sinatra cover from covers compilation Stubbs the Zombie: The Soundtrack and later released on B-Sides and Rarities.
The song "Mah Nà Mah Nà", recorded for VH1's For the Kids, was originally recorded by Piero Umiliani.
The song "Half as Much", written by Curley Williams and performed by Hank Williams Sr.
The song "Excuse Me (I Think I've Got a Heartache)", originally by Buck Owens.
The song "What's Now Is Now" is a cover of a Frank Sinatra song and is on their album Showroom of Compassion.
The song "Reincarnation", written and performed by Roger Miller, is featured on the tribute album King of the Road: A Tribute to Roger Miller.

Notes

References

External links
Cake's official web site

Discographies of American artists
Rock music group discographies
Discography